Tracy Axten (born 20 July 1963) is a female retired English discus thrower.

Athletics career
She represented England in the discus event, at the 1998 Commonwealth Games in Kuala Lumpur, Malaysia.

Her personal best throw was 58.18 metres, achieved in May 1997 in Cardiff. This places her seventh on the British outdoor all-time list, behind Meg Ritchie, Venissa Head, Philippa Roles, Shelley Newman, Jackie McKernan and Debbie Callaway. She was also the 1993 British champion.

References

1963 births
Living people
British female discus throwers
English female discus throwers
Commonwealth Games competitors for England
Athletes (track and field) at the 1998 Commonwealth Games